Morristown-Hamblen High School East (also known as Morristown East High School and formerly known as Morristown High School) is a secondary school located in Morristown, Tennessee. MHHSE is the oldest accredited high school in the state of Tennessee. The school incorporates grades 9-12.  The school mascot is "Storm" the Ibis, students and faculty are known as the Hurricanes and the school colors are orange and black. The school had an enrollment of around 1,520 students as of the 2017-2018 school year. Joseph Ely is the head principal.

History

Morristown High School was built in 1923 and was admitted to the Southern Association of Colleges and Schools. Isenberg-Siler Gymnasium was added in 1954 and the third floor was added in 1955. The south wing was added in 1968.  A major renovation occurred in 1989 at a cost of 8.9 million dollars.  A 1.3 million dollar library was opened in 2004 and was named in memory of Dr. Joe E. Gibson, Sr., a former School Board Member and East High supporter. A multimillion-dollar school-wide renovation/remodel occurred between 2010 and 2012. This included the addition of a new administrative wing, a new cafeteria, Freshman Academy, STEM (science, technology, engineering, mathematics) Academy, and Health Wing.

The school changed names in 1968 and has been known as Morristown-Hamblen High School East since that time due to the new high school, Morristown-Hamblen High School West for students who lived west of Morristown.  The building is of traditional style and is located half a mile from the center of downtown Morristown. Morristown High School was known originally as the Golden Hurricanes but the name has been changed to the Hurricanes.  The symbol used in earlier years was a tornado.  However, the new logo is that of a hurricane, created for MHHSE by a design artist from New Jersey.

The main building at Morristown East has dozens of classrooms, a cafeteria, an auditorium, a gymnasium, STEM Academy, Freshman Academy, Health and Wellness Center, and a library.

In 2019, Principal Gary Johnson retired after holding the position of  principal for 29 years.

Awards and recognitions
1969 AAA Football State Champions
 2000 – Scholar Bowl, Won East TN PBS Regional
 2005 – No Child Left Behind, Blue Ribbon School
 2008, 2009, & 2010 – U.S. News & World Report, Bronze Medal School

Statement of Beliefs
 Student learning is our primary goal and, thus, guides all site-based decisions.
 Student learning is enhanced by a safe and physically comfortable environment.
 Students are valued as individuals with unique physical, social, emotional, and intellectual needs.
 Students are empowered to learn when they are engaged in the learning process.
 Students become more confident, independent learners when there is a commitment to continuous improvement.
 A student's character is cultivated through positive relationships, mutual respect, and opportunities to perform leadership roles.
 Student assessments provide a variety of meaningful opportunities for students to demonstrate their achievement and mastery of skills.
 The participation of stakeholders (i.e. parents/guardians, local businesses, social workers, etc.) is imperative for the success of the school and the community.

Academics

Advanced Placement Program

 AP Biology
 AP Calculus IBC
 AP Calculus II
 AP Chemistry
 AP U.S. Government
 AP Human Geography
 AP Language/Composition
 AP Literature/Composition
 AP Psychology
 AP U.S. History

Honors Program

 Adv. Algebra/Trigonometry (H)
 Aerospace Engineering (H)
 Algebra I (H)
 Algebra II (H)
 Bioenergy Research (H)
 Biology I (H)
 Biology II (H)
 Calculus I (H)
 Chemistry (H)
 Chemistry II (H)
 Civil Engineering (H)
 Comp. Integrated Manu. (H)
 Digital Electronics (H)
 Engin. Design & Development (H)
 English I-III (H)
 Geometry (H)
 Introd. to Engin. Design (H)
 Medical Therapeutics-Pharmacy Tech. (H)
 Physical Science (H)
 Physics (H)
 PreCalculus (H)
 Principles of Engineering (H)
 U.S. Government/Economics (H)
 U.S. History (H)
 World Geography (9th grade only) (H)

Dual Enrollment Program

 Courses taken at Walters State Community College, Carson Newman University, and online through Tusculum College.

Online Courses

 Some courses offered online through The Niswonger Foundation.

Fine Arts

Vocal music

Director Coleman Lowary 
 Advanced Chorus (high-level high school choral ensemble)
 Concert Choir (intermediate-level high school choral ensemble)
 Intro Choir (beginner-level high school choral ensemble)
 Women's Chorus (one semester women's choral ensemble)

Instrumental Music

Director Brandon Tilley
 Marching Band
 Concert Band

Visual Art

 Art I-IV

Sports

Sports offered at Morristown East High School include baseball, men and women's basketball, cheerleading, cross country, American football, golf, men and women's soccer, softball, swimming, tennis, track, volleyball, and wrestling.

Burke-Toney Stadium
Burke-Toney Stadium, located on the grounds of Morristown East High, is used for home football games for both East and West. The schools alternate the home title each year when they play each other. The East vs. West football game is usually the most attended game of the year. The stadium is also used for soccer and band practice. East has won a total of 69 games since the school has opened.

Student organizations

Student Council

The Student Council represents the student body and gives them a channel through which their opinions may be expressed and considered in the policy making of the school. It is hoped that all students at MHHSE will take an active part in the Student Council, either as a candidate, a campaigner, or as an interested voter. The Student Council is also known as "StuCo" to the students of MHHSE.

Clubs and Organizations
A variety of clubs and organizations are active on the campus of MHHSE. Each group encourages students to get involved and participate.
 Anime Club
 Beta Club
 DECA
 Drama/Forensics
 FBLA
 FCCLA
 FFA
 First Priority
 FTA
 German Society
 HOSA
 Interact
 Jazz band
 NAC
 PEP Club
 SAFE Club
 Scholar's Bowl
 Science Club
 Spanish Club
 Videogame Club

Administration
Mr. Joseph Ely - Principal
Dr. Sarah Cooper - Assistant Principal
Mr. Bradley D. Hall - Assistant Principal
Mr. T.J. Sewell - Assistant Principal

Notable alumni 
 Ermal Allen, NFL football player and coach; Super Bowl winner
 Arnold W. Bunch Jr., U.S. Air Force four-star general and current commander of Air Force Materiel Command
 Amy Greene, novelist and contributor to The New York Times
 Brett Martin, MLB pitcher
 Randy Sanders, head football coach for East Tennessee State
 Jane Wagner, playwright and actress who wrote The Search for Signs of Intelligent Life in the Universe

References

External links
Morristown Hamblen High School East
Hamblen County Department of Education
National Center for Education Statistics data for Morristown East High School

Educational institutions established in 1968
Public high schools in Tennessee
Schools in Hamblen County, Tennessee
Morristown, Tennessee